Soghlom Avlod Stadium FC Andijon

Sports venues built in the Soviet Union
Football venues in Uzbekistan
Athletics (track and field) venues in Uzbekistan
Sports venues in Uzbekistan
Uzbekistan
Multi-purpose stadiums in Uzbekistan
Andijan